Tvrdoň is a surname. Notable people with the surname include:

 Marek Tvrdoň (born 1993), Slovak ice hockey player
 Marián Tvrdoň (born 1994), Slovak footballer
 Roman Tvrdoň (born 1981), Slovak ice hockey player

Slovak-language surnames